The London Reefs are located between  and  ( and ) in the Spratly Islands of the South China Sea.

The four major features within the area (Central London Reef, Cuarteron Reef, East London Reef, and West London Reef), are known by many names:

References

 
Reefs of the Spratly Islands